Planktotalea frisia is a heterotrophic and aerobic bacterium from the genus of Planktotalea which has been isolated from seawater from the North Sea in Germany.

References 

Rhodobacteraceae
Bacteria described in 2012